Sujatha Gidla is an Indian-American author. Gidla is known for her book Ants Among Elephants: An Untouchable Family and the Making of Modern India. She was born in Andhra Pradesh and moved to the United States in 1990, when she was 26 years old. She now lives in New York and works as a conductor on the New York City Subway.

Early life 
Sujatha Gidla was raised in the Christian Dalit family, in Kakinada, a small town in present-day Andhra Pradesh. Her great grandparents accepted Christianity during Colonial rule after they heard the Gospel propagated by Canadian Baptist missionaries in the town.  With missionary institutions heralding development of the society in general through education, Sujatha's grandparents were also educated at one such institution run by the missionaries in Kakianda. Prasanna Rao, Gidla's grandfather, studied in a school set up by the Canadian missionaries. Gidla's parents were also college lecturers.

After getting her bachelor's degree from State-run Pithapuram Rajah Government College in Kakinada, Gidla enrolled in a Masters' program in Physics in Regional Engineering College, Warangal. During her second year there, in one of the earlier instances of her activism, Gidla participated in a strike against an upper-caste professor in the Engineering department, who was deliberately failing students from the lower castes. She was the only woman who had participated in the strike. The protestors were all jailed in an undisclosed location. Gidla was detained for three months, during which she was tortured and contracted tuberculosis. Her mother Manjula contacted a civil rights lawyer named K. G. Kannabiran to help them. This was one of the earlier instances of Gidla's activism.

Gidla then worked as a researcher associate in the Department of Applied Physics in Indian Institute of Technology Madras, where she worked on a project funded by Indian Space Research Organisation. She moved to the United States when she was 26. Some of Gidla's family members also emigrated: her sister works as a physician in the United States, and her brother is an engineer in Canada.

Work 
Gidla previously worked as an software application designer at the Bank of New York, but was laid off in the global financial crisis and recession in 2009. She says that she then wanted to do a manual job. She became the first Indian woman to be employed as a conductor on the New York City Subway – one of the busiest mass transit systems in the world. In an interview, she said, "Because I am a Marxist and Communist, I also have romantic feelings about being a working class person. So this job attracted me. Secondly, I wanted to do something that men are supposed to be doing."

Ants Among Elephants 
Ants Among Elephants is Gidla's first book and was published in 2017. It is a family memoir that chronicles the life of her uncle, KG Satyamurty, a Maoist leader and the founder of a left-wing militant organization called the People's War Group (PWG). The book also described the personal history of her mother Manjula's life, both of which are juxtaposed against the peasant revolt and the formation of a new state in newly independent India. Gidla classifies the book under the genre of 'literary nonfiction'.

Gidla has recalled her introduction to understanding casteism as being through a movie. The film was a love story fraught with conflict due to the girl being a wealthy Christian, whose family opposed her marriage to a Hindu boy who was less well-off. She had hitherto believed that the caste discrimination she faced as a Dalit, or "untouchable", was due to her status as a Christian, since the vast majority of Christians in Andhra Pradesh converted from a Dalit community. In an interview with Slate, she says, "That's when I started thinking: If it’s not Christianity, why were we untouchables?"

According to Gidla, the creation of the book was a family affair. Her mother was closely involved in the process of writing the book as it was her story too, and her niece Anagha was involved in designing the book cover.  Gidla conducted over 15 years of research and made three trips to India for the book.. She reportedly wrote 50 to 60 versions of the book before publishing it Gidla has spoken about publishing first a prequel, and then a sequel to Ants Among Elephants. The prequel will tell her own family's story before her uncle's generation, detailing the journey of her family being hunter-gatherers in the forests of Andhra Pradesh before moving to the villages and getting subsumed into the Hindu caste system's lowest rung. The sequel will be an autobiography, and discuss the contemporary generation.

Her writing has also appeared in Oxford India Anthology of Telugu Dalit Writing.

Reception and publicity  
Ants Among Elephants has received the following accolades:

 Wall Street Journal Top 10 Nonfiction Book of 2017
 Publishers Weekly Best Book of 2017
 Shelf Awareness Best Book of 2017
 Hudson Booksellers Best Books of the Year (2017)
 Publishers Weekly Best Books of the Year (2017)
 Wall Street Journal Best Books of the Year (2017)

A New York Times review called it "unsentimental, deeply poignant ...  Ants Among Elephants gives readers an unsettling and visceral understanding of how discrimination, segregation and stereotypes have endured."

Gidla declined an invitation to be the key note speaker in a festival called We The Women, a women-only festival curated by Barkha Dutt. Her refusal was a result of the conference being sponsored by the United Nations, which Gidla said was a "fig-leaf of US imperialism". She also objected to the participation of Smriti Irani, an Indian politician who was the Minister of Human Resource Development at the time that Dalit PhD scholar Rohith Vemula committed suicide. "She was instrumental in Rohith's death. His blood is on her hands. I couldn't possibly have participated alongside her," she said.

Gidla was invited to the prestigious Jaipur Literature Festival in 2018 as a speaker. She spoke at a session called "Narratives of Power, Songs of Resistance", where she spoke about contemporary Dalit politicians Jignesh Mevani and Mayawati, saying they had a limitation in working for Dalit upliftment since they had chosen to work under the framework of electoral politics. Gidla also discussed the communalism present in both of India's major political parties, the Bharatiya Janata Party and the Indian National Congress, as well as criticized Mahatma Gandhi for being casteist and racist.

References

Year of birth missing (living people)
Living people
American novelists of Indian descent
American women novelists
American women writers of Indian descent
Dalit activists
Women from Telangana
Telugu people
People from Kakinada
Canadian Baptist Ministries
People from East Godavari district
21st-century American women